The Man Worth While is a 1921 American silent melodrama film, directed by Romaine Fielding. It stars Joan Arliss, Lawrence Johnson, and Eugene Acker, and was released on September 9, 1921.

Cast list
 Joan Arliss as Mary Alden
 Lawrence Johnson as the child
 Eugene Acker as Herbert Loring
 Margaret Seddon as Mrs. Ward
 Frederick Eckhart as André
 Peggy Parr as Cecile
 Herbert Standing as Mrs. Forbes-Grey
 Vanda Tierendelli as Miss Flo
 Barney Gilmore as the judge
 Natalie O'Brien as the dancer
 Tex Cooper as the parson
 Kid Broad as a Lifer
 Emile Le Croix as the doctor
 Frank De Vernon as Eddie Loring
 Burt Hodkins as Percy
 Clarence Heritage as the sheriff
 Ruth Buchanan as the operator
 Tammany Young as Useless
 Billy Quirk as Napoleon
 Romaine Fielding as Don Ward

References

External links

Melodrama films
Films directed by Romaine Fielding
American silent feature films
American black-and-white films
Silent American drama films
1921 drama films
1921 films
1920s American films